Oliver may refer to:

Arts, entertainment and literature

Books 
 Oliver the Western Engine, volume 24 in  The Railway Series by Rev. W. Awdry
 Oliver Twist, a novel by Charles Dickens

Fictional characters 
 Ariadne Oliver, in the novels of Agatha Christie
 Oliver (Disney character)
 Oliver Fish, a gay police officer on the American soap opera One Life to Live
 Oliver Hampton, in the American television series How to Get Away with Murder
 Oliver Jones (The Bold and the Beautiful), on the American soap opera The Bold and the Beautiful
 Oliver Lightload, in the movie Cars
 Oliver Oken, from Hannah Montana
 Oliver (paladin), a paladin featured in the Matter of France
 Oliver Queen, DC Comic book hero also known as the Green Arrow
 Oliver (Thomas and Friends character), a locomotive in the Thomas and Friends franchise
 Oliver Trask, a controversial minor character from the first season of The O.C.
 Oliver Twist (character), the protagonist of Dickens' novel Oliver Twist
 Oliver Wendell Douglas, on the American television situation comedy Green Acres
 Oliver, the main character of the role-playing game Ni no Kuni: Wrath of the White Witch
 Tommy Oliver, from Power Rangers

Film 
 Oliver! (film), a 1968 musical by Carol Reed based on the stage musical
 Oliver! (soundtrack), the soundtrack to the 1968 British musical film of the same name

Stage
 Oliver!, a 1960 musical by Lionel Bart based on Dickens' novel Oliver Twist

Television 
 "Oliver", an episode of The Good Doctor

Music 
 Oliver (DJs), electronic music production and DJ duo based in Los Angeles
 Oliver EP, released by Irish singer-songwriter Gemma Hayes in 2008
 Oliver (singer) (1945–2000), American pop singer best known for the hit song "Good Morning Starshine"
 Oliver (software), an English speaking Vocaloid by PowerFX who was released for Vocaloid 3
 "Oliver!" (song), a 1960 song from the stage musical Oliver!
 "Oliver" (song), a 1979 song by Anita Skorgan

Business
Oliver Farm Equipment Company, an American farm equipment manufacturer (1929–1960)
Oliver Typewriter Company, an American typewriter manufacturer (1895–1926)

People
Oliver (given name)
Oliver (surname)
Oliver (Scottish surname), associated with a Scottish sept
Oliver (Middlesex cricketer) (fl. 1787), an English cricketer
Oliver (Surrey cricketer) (fl. 1824–1828), an English cricketer

Places

Canada 
Oliver, British Columbia, a small town in the Okanagan Valley; known as the Wine Capital of Canada
Oliver, Edmonton, an urban neighborhood west of downtown Edmonton, Alberta
Oliver, Essex County, Ontario, a town
Oliver Glacier, Baffin Island, Nunavut
Oliver, Nova Scotia, a town

United States 
Oliver, Arkansas, an unincorporated community
Oliver, Georgia, a city
Oliver, Edgar County, Illinois, an unincorporated community
Oliver, Whiteside County, Illinois, an unincorporated community
Oliver, Indiana, an unincorporated community
Oliver, Baltimore, Maryland, a neighborhood
Oliver, Nebraska, an unincorporated community
Oliver, Pennsylvania, a census-designated place
Oliver, Wisconsin, a village
Oliver County, North Dakota
Oliver Street, Baltimore, Maryland
Oliver Township (disambiguation)
Lake Oliver, a reservoir in Georgia and Alabama
Lake Oliver (South Dakota)

Elsewhere 
Oliver Island (Antarctica)
Oliver Island (Western Australia)

Other uses
Oliver (chimpanzee), a former performing ape
Oliver (Top Gear), nickname for a car in Top Gear: Botswana Special
Oliver Bridge, a railroad bridge that connects Oliver, Wisconsin with Duluth, Minnesota
Oliver High School, Pittsburgh, Pennsylvania, a former public school now used as offices
Oliver Winery, Bloomington, Indiana

See also
Olive, a species of small tree in the family Oleaceae
Oliver Township (disambiguation)
Olivier (disambiguation)